Elodina parthia, the chalk white, is a butterfly in the family Pieridae. It is found in the Australian states of New South Wales and Queensland.

The wingspan is about 35 mm. The upperside of the wings is white with dark brown wingtips, while the underside is white with a yellow patch near the body.

The larvae feed on various Capparaceae species, including Capparis arborea, Capparis canescens and Capparis spinosa. They are green with a white dorsal line and sometimes some dark red spots. Pupation takes place in a green pupa with white stripes, which is attached to a twig or leaf of the host plant.

References

Butterflies described in 1853
parthia